Max Weber (2 August 1897 in Zürich – 2 December 1974 in Bern) was a Swiss politician.

A member of the Social Democratic Party, Weber was seven times elected to the National Council, the lower house of the Swiss parliament (the Federal Assembly), serving continuously from 4 December 1939 to 31 December 1951 and then again from 5 December 1955 to 28 November 1971. 

On 13 December 1951 he was elected to the Swiss Federal Council (the seven-member executive that constitutes Switzerland's federal government) where he headed the Federal Department of Finance from 1 January 1952 until 31 December 1953. Weber took the decision to resign from his seat on the Council with effect from 31 January 1954 after a referendum held on 6 December 1953 had rejected his federal budget proposals.

References

External links

1897 births
1974 deaths
Members of the Federal Council (Switzerland)
Finance ministers of Switzerland
Politicians from Zürich
Social Democratic Party of Switzerland politicians
Swiss Calvinist and Reformed Christians
Swiss conscientious objectors